The 2018 Nevada Wolf Pack football team represented the University of Nevada, Reno in the 2018 NCAA Division I FBS football season. The Wolf Pack were led by second–year head coach Jay Norvell and played their home games at Mackay Stadium. They were members of the West Division of the Mountain West Conference. They finished the season 8–5 and 5–3 in Mountain West play to finish in a tie for second place in the West division.

Preseason

Award watch lists

Mountain West media days
The Mountain West media days were held on July 24–25, 2018, at the Cosmopolitan in Paradise, Nevada.

Media poll
The preseason poll was released on July 24, 2018. The Wolf Pack were predicted to finish in fourth place in the MW West Division.

Preseason All–Mountain West Team
The Wolf Pack had three players selected to the preseason All–Mountain West Team; one from the offense and two from the defense.

Offense

McLane Mannix – WR

Defense

Malik Reed – LB

Dameon Baber – DB

Schedule

Personnel

Game summaries

Portland State

at Vanderbilt

Oregon State

at Toledo

at Air Force

Fresno State

Boise State

at Hawaii

San Diego State

Colorado State

at San Jose State

at UNLV

vs. Arkansas State (Arizona Bowl)

References

Nevada
Nevada Wolf Pack football seasons
Arizona Bowl champion seasons
Nevada Wolf Pack football